Marvin Johnson (born April 12, 1954) is an American former boxer who was a 3-time light-heavyweight champion of the world. As an amateur, Johnson fought in the 1972 Olympics in Munich, winning a bronze medal, and made his way up the professional ranks in the light heavyweight division soon thereafter. Johnson was inducted into the World Boxing Hall of Fame in 2008 alongside Lennox Lewis and Pernell Whitaker. His nickname is "Pops".

Amateur career
 Won the 1971 National Golden Gloves Light Heavyweight Championship, March 22 at Fort Worth, Texas:

 Won the 1971 National AAU Light Heavyweight (178 lb.) Championship, May 1 at New Orleans, Louisiana:
Finals: Defeated Hernando Molyneaux KO 1
 Won the 1971 North American (178 lb.) Championship, May 31 at Latham, New York:
Defeated William Titley (Canada) TKO 1
 Won The 1972 National Golden Gloves Middleweight (165 lb.) Championship, March 20 at Minneapolis, Minnesota:
1/2: Defeated Joey Hadley by decision 
Finals: Defeated Don Rucker KO 2 
 Represented the United States at the 1972 Munich Olympic Games, earning a bronze medal in the 165 pound class, after he was knocked out in the semifinal by eventual gold medalist Vyacheslav Lemeshev of the Soviet Union.

1972 Olympic results
Below are the results of Marvin Johnson, an American middleweight boxer, who competed at the 1972 Munich Olympics:

 Round of 16: Defeated Ewald Jarmer (West Germany) by unanimous decision, 5–0
 Quarterfinal: Defeated Alejandro Montoya (Cuba) by unanimous decision, 5–0
 Semifinal: Lost to Vyacheslav Lemeshev (Soviet Union) by second-round TKO (was awarded bronze medal)

Professional career
As a professional, Johnson won his first 15 bouts, including a nationally televised 4th round knockout over highly regarded veteran Tom "The Bomb" Bethea.  However, Johnson lost for the first time as a professional in his next fight, against rising contender Matthew Franklin (later known as Matthew Saad Muhammad) by 12th round knockout in a furious battle for the NABF light heavyweight title. Following this setback, Johnson rallied, not for the last time in his career, impressively winning several bouts, until losing a decision to highly ranked Lottie Mwale.  A subsequent win over Jerry Celestine set up a world title fight, which saw Johnson taking the WBC light heavyweight crown from fellow southpaw Mate Parlov of Yugoslavia via 10th-round KO in Italy in December 1978.  For his first title defense, in April 1979, Johnson chose Matthew Franklin, the very man who had beaten him in an epic war two years earlier.  In front of his hometown Indianapolis fans, Johnson engaged Franklin in a rematch of such intensity and drama that it is regarded among boxing historians as one of the greatest title fights in history. Mirroring their first brutal encounter, Johnson controlled the early going, but the Philadelphia-based Franklin gamely hung in.  The tide turned in the 6th and 7th rounds as Johnson began to tire.  Ultimately Franklin prevailed in the 8th, a round of such ferocity that it would enter boxing lore, stopping Johnson late in the frame, despite bleeding severely himself from the nose and from cuts around both eyes.

Showing the resilience that would mark his career, Johnson would again win a world title belt later that very year—this time the WBA version—by fighting the rugged Victor Galindez from Argentina in New Orleans as part of a three-fight 'television card' that included two title bouts (Antuofermo-Hagler I and Benitez-Leonard) staged in Las Vegas.  After a see-saw battle through the first ten rounds, Johnson nailed—and floored—Galindez with one of his fabled 'over-the-top-from-underneath' left hands, and the title changed hands when the champion's corner surrendered after Galindez hit the canvas.

As with his previous first title defense, Johnson again chose the strongest available contender to challenge for his belt, this time Eddie Gregory (later to be known as Eddie Mustafa Muhammad).  On the Tate–Weaver undercard in Knoxville in March 1980, Johnson fought courageously, but ultimately succumbed to Eddie Mustafa Muhammad (née Gregory), who used a vicious body attack to outwork, out-hustle and out last the game champion en route to an 11th-round TKO victory.

Things looked bleak when Johnson fought the up-and-coming Michael Spinks in early 1981—just before Spinks dethroned Johnson's latest conqueror, Mustafa Muhammad.  Johnson was off to a promising start, but the 1976 Olympian Spinks landed his famous "Spinks jinx" that put Johnson out for good in the fourth round.

Johnson recovered and proceeded to win 16 straight fights, defeating good fighters like Charles Williams along the way, and in February 1986 would again be before his Indianapolis fans, fighting Leslie Stewart of Trinidad and Tobago for the WBA light heavyweight title that became vacant when Spinks abdicated to become a heavyweight.  Stewart gave Johnson some fits, but cuts would take their toll on Stewart and were the reason that the fight was stopped in the seventh round, thus making Johnson the first ever three-time champion in the division.  An injury postponed his first defense against Jean-Marie Emebe of Cameroon, but the two would hook up in Indianapolis in September of that year.  It was the first time that Johnson would both enter and leave the ring as champion—he was the winner by 13th-round TKO.

Next, it was on to Trinidad and Tobago for a rematch with Stewart on May 23, 1987.  However, it was all Stewart this time, as he floored Johnson several times in the first few rounds, and while Johnson always regained his feet and was never counted out he did tell his cornermen after eight rounds that 'enough was enough,' and by doing so became an ex-champ for a third time.

Johnson retired after that bout.

Honors
Named The Ring magazine Comeback of the Year fighter for 1984.

Professional boxing record

Life after boxing
Johnson currently serves as a civilian employee for the Marion County Sheriff's Office in Indianapolis, Indiana, where he formerly served as a Deputy.

See also
List of world light-heavyweight boxing champions

References

External links

1954 births
Living people
Boxers from Indiana
Sportspeople from Indianapolis
American male boxers
African-American boxers
National Golden Gloves champions
Winners of the United States Championship for amateur boxers
Boxers at the 1972 Summer Olympics
Medalists at the 1972 Summer Olympics
Olympic bronze medalists for the United States in boxing
Light-heavyweight boxers
World light-heavyweight boxing champions
World Boxing Association champions
World Boxing Council champions
21st-century African-American people
20th-century African-American sportspeople